Anchor Me is an EP by The Blackeyed Susans, released in March 1991.

Track listing 
 "Glory Glory" (Kakulas) – 4:47
 "Anchor Me" (Snarski) – 4:03
 "Who’s That By The Window?" (Kakulas) – 2:43
 "Trouble" (Kakulas/Rollinson) – 4:13

Personnel 
 Rob Snarski – vocals, acoustic guitar
 Kathryn Wemyss – vocals, trumpet, castanets
 Phillip Kakulas – double bass
 Kenny Davis Junior – piano, piano accordion
 James Cruikshank – organ
 Graham Lee – pedal steel
 Mark Dawson – percussion
 Tim Rollinson – electric guitar

References

The Blackeyed Susans albums
1991 EPs